Flowered Up were an English indie pop-alternative dance band, formed in Camden Town, London, in 1989, active during the Baggy movement.  Their 13-minute single "Weekender" reached the UK top 20. The band split up in 1994 amid drug problems. Following a failed reformation attempt in 2007 and a solo record deal that fell through, frontman Liam Maher died from a heroin overdose in 2009, followed by his brother Joe also of a heroin overdose in 2012.

Career
The band was formed in mid-1989 by singer Liam Maher along with lifelong friend, Darren 'Des' Penney. Des would co-write lyrics and manage the band. The original line up included the late John O'brien on drums, Joe Maher, Liam's younger brother, on guitar and bass player Andrew Jackson. Simon Gannon would guest on keyboard and this line up would play the first two gigs. After a few changes in personnel, the settled line-up included keyboardist Tim Dorney and drummer John Tuvey, with dancer Barry Mooncult adding to their live shows. After releasing two singles ("It's On" and "Phobia") on Heavenly Records, both of which were minor hits, Flowered Up signed to London Records and recorded their only album, A Life With Brian, in 1991. "Take It" had lyrics from Joe Strummer. The group appeared on the covers of both Melody Maker and NME before releasing the album.

A Life With Brian contained many of their popular live songs, as well as new versions of the previously released singles. Not long afterwards, Flowered Up released the 13-minute-long single "Weekender" on Heavenly, with a video  directed by W.I.Z. starring Lee Whitlock and Anna Haigh. Despite the group's—and Heavenly's—refusal to compromise on a standard-length edit for radio play (although two "radio edits" were circulated, neither really addressed the needs of radio programmers, as one was merely the full-length version but with the two instances of the phrase "fuck off" muted, while the other reduced the length of the intro, but still ran for over 12 minutes), the track went on to become their biggest hit, reaching number 20 in the UK Singles Chart. After much-publicised drug problems with some members of the band, and unproductive (and some unreleased) studio work, the band split up. Keyboardist Tim Dorney went on to form Republica.

A Life With Brian was re-released by London Records as The Best of Flowered Up, and included the original version of "Weekender". Flowered Up tried to re-form in 2007, but Dorney refused, and the planned reunion tour was cancelled.

On 20 October 2009, Liam Maher died of a heroin overdose, aged 41, followed in November 2012 by Joe Maher.

Discography

Albums

Singles

References

External links
 Heavenly Records artist profile

English rock music groups
English electronic music groups
Heavenly Recordings artists
Madchester groups
Musical groups from London
Musical groups established in 1990
Musical groups disestablished in 1994